"Ooh Boy" (sometimes known as "Ooh Boy (I Love You So)") is a song written by Norman Whitfield and originally recorded by American soul and R&B group Rose Royce for their second album, In Full Bloom (1977). It was released as the third single from the album.

Track listing
 Vinyl/7" single
A: "Ooh Boy" – 4:15
B: "You Can't Please Everybody" – 3:47

Charts

Real McCoy version

In 1995, German Eurodance project Real McCoy released a double A-sided single of "Sleeping with an Angel/Ooh Boy". It was released as the fifth and final single from their debut album, Another Night (1995). The single peaked at number 31 in Iceland and number 19 on the US Billboard Hot Dance Club Play chart. "Ooh Boy" was produced by Douglas Carr, Per Adebratt and Tommy Ekman, while "Sleeping with an Angel" was produced by Billy Steinberg and Rick Nowels.

Critical reception
In his review of "Sleeping with an Angel", Larry Flick from Billboard wrote, "Here is a total change of pace from the act's previous Euro-NRG hits. Cruising at a chilled pop/hip hop pace, the track's instrumental arrangement combines delicate piano lines with a rubbery bassline and diamond-hard beat. The vocals are also an exercise in contrast, as mournful rapping is surrounded by dreamy, harmonic vocals at the chorus. Single has a wintery vibe that will likely play well with the act's fans at top 40 and crossover formats."

Dave Sholin from the Gavin Report said about "Ooh Boy", "The Class of '96 were babies when Rose Royce charted with this song in 1978. The Real McCoy works their magic and makes it fresh again. Uptempo and definitely radio friendly." Rachel Cohen from The Heights noted that it "is a fusion of techno with an almost Pop Rock, Paula Abdul sound. It takes the well used line, "Ooh Boy I love you so, never ever gonna let you go, once I get my hands on you," and puts it in a brand new context, and the novel ereation works well." A reviewer from People Magazine said that "group leader Olaf Jeglitza broods like a rapping cowpoke stuck in a tacky rhinestone-studded suit" on "Sleeping With An Angel".

Track listing
 CD single
"Sleeping with an Angel" (Album Version) – 4:26
"Ooh Boy" (Extended Single Version) – 4:47
"Ooh Boy" (Uno Clio Extended Remix) – 7:44
"Ooh Boy" (Armand's South Of The Border Mix) – 7:02
"Love & Devotion" (Development Corp. Mix) – 5:42

 Cassette single
A: "Sleeping With An Angel" – 4:26
B1: "Ooh Boy" (Album Version) – 3:04
B2: "Ooh Boy" (Uno Clio Remix) – 3:56

Charts

Other cover versions
 In 1978, Althea & Donna covered  "Ooh Boy" and titled it "Oh Dread" for their album Uptown Top Ranking.
 In 1991, Lou-C. covered "Ooh Boy" for her CD album (Maxi-single) in Germany.
 In 2001, Regina Belle covered "Ooh Boy" for her album This Is Regina!.
 In 2004, Marcia Hines covered "Ooh Boy" for her album Hinesight.

Samples
 "Knockin' Boots" (by Candyman) from the 1990 album Ain't No Shame in My Game
 "Love You So" (by Mase) from his 1997 album Harlem World
 "Luv Me, Luv Me" (by Shaggy and Janet Jackson) from the 1997 album How Stella Got Her Groove Back
 "Luv Me, Luv Me" (by Shaggy and Samantha Cole) from the 2001 album Hot Shot
 "Ooh Girl" (by Blackstreet) from their 2003 album Level II
 "I Love You" (by Cazwell) from his 2019 single
 In 2020, The Skivvies used the chorus in their cover of "Damn It, Janet" as part of the album The Rocky Horror Skivvies Show.

External links

1976 songs
1977 singles
1995 singles
Rose Royce songs
Real McCoy (band) songs
Songs written by Norman Whitfield
Whitfield Records singles
Arista Records singles
Song recordings produced by Norman Whitfield
Song recordings produced by Rick Nowels